Nader Entessar (born 1948) is an Iranian political scientist, Professor and Chair of the Department of Political Science and Criminal Justice, University of South Alabama. He achieved a bachelor's degree from the University of California, Los Angeles, and a master's degree and Ph.D. from the Saint Louis University. He is known for his research on Middle East politics.

Books
 Kurdish Politics in the Middle East
 Kurdish Ethnonationalism, 1992
 Iran Nuclear Negotiations: Accord and Détente since the Geneva Agreement of 2013 
 Trump and Iran: From Containment to Confrontation,
 Iran Nuclear Accord and the Remaking of the Middle East

References

International relations scholars
Living people
Iranian political scientists
1948 births